Hawthorne is a toponymic surname of British and Irish origin, originally for someone who lived near a hawthorn hedge or in a place with such a name.

Notable people
 Bert Hawthorne (1943–1972), New Zealand racing driver
 Charles Webster Hawthorne (1872–1930), American painter
 Denys Hawthorne (1932–2009), Northern Ireland actor
 Frank Hawthorne (born 1946), Canadian mineralogist and crystallographer
 M. Frederick Hawthorne (born 1928), American chemist
 Greg Hawthorne (born 1956), American football player
 Dr. James C. Hawthorne (1819–1881), established and oversaw Portland, Oregon's Hospital for the Insane
 James Hawthorne (fl. 1951–2006), BBC controller in Northern Ireland
 Jim Hawthorne (disambiguation)
 John Hawthorne, philosopher, Waynflete Professor of Metaphysical Philosophy at Oxford University
 Julian Hawthorne (1846–1934), son of Nathaniel Hawthorne and an author 
 Kim Hawthorne, American actress
 Koryn Hawthorne (born 1997), American musician and contestant from The Voice season 8
 Mayer Hawthorne (born 1979), American vocalist and musician
 Nate Hawthorne (1951–2005), American basketball player
 Nathaniel Hawthorne (1804–1864), novelist and short story writer, a key figure in American literature
 Nigel Hawthorne (1929–2001), British actor
 Phil Hawthorne  (1943–1994), Australian rugby footballer
 Rob Hawthorne, English football commentator
 Robert Hawthorne (1822–1879), Irish recipient of the Victoria Cross
 Sophia Hawthorne (1809–1871), American transcendentalist painter
 Susan Hawthorne (born 1951), Australian writer, poet, political commentator and publisher
 William Hawthorne (1913–2011), British professor of engineering

Fictional characters
Angela Hawthorne, character in Coronation Street
 Christina Hawthorne, character in Hawthorne
 Sadie Hawthorne, title character from the Canadian television series Naturally, Sadie
 Dahlia and Iris Hawthorne, characters in the video game Phoenix Wright: Ace Attorney − Trials and Tribulations
 Gale Hawthorne, character in The Hunger Games
 Pierce Hawthorne, character in the television series Community
 Alicia and Izzy Hawthorne, characters in Lightyear
 Michonne Hawthorne, character in The Walking Dead
 Colonel Arnold Hawthorne, character in the motion picture The Prophecy
 Nathaniel Hawthorne, character in Bungo Stray Dogs
 Pauline Hawthorne, character in the television miniseries Little Fires Everywhere

English-language surnames
Surnames of English origin
English toponymic surnames
Surnames of British Isles origin